United States gubernatorial elections were held in 1958, in 34 states, concurrent with the House and Senate elections, on November 4, 1958 (September 8 in Maine, November 25 in Alaska).  Alaska held its first gubernatorial election on achieving statehood.

In Colorado, Maine and Ohio, the governor was elected to a 4-year term for the first time, instead of a 2-year term.

Results

See also
 1958 United States elections
 1958 United States House of Representatives elections
 1958 United States Senate elections

References

 
Gubernatorial elections
1950s